The Slovak Chamber of Architects is a self-governing, state-owned legal entity of non-business nature based in Bratislava. It was established on 1 June 1992 by the Act of the Slovak National Council no. 138/1992 Coll (č. 138/1992 Zb.), about authorized architects and authorized building engineers. It is financed from own revenues without state subsidies. It is a member of the Architectural Council of Europe (ACE) and part of the network of competent authorities in architecture – the  European Network of Architects Competent Authorities (ENACA). The organization brings together the architects and landscape architects in Slovakia.

Publication 

Authorized landscape architects are a minority group in the chamber. In 2015 the publication Záhradná krajinná architektúra na Slovensku, 33 záhradných a krajinných architektov Slovenska (Landscape Architecture in Slovakia, with the subtitle 33 garden and landscape architects of Slovakia), . was published. It represents 33 encyclopaedically processed profiles of the most important contemporary Slovak garden architects and their creations. The aim of the publication is to highlight quality examples of implemented gardens and park modifications in Slovakia.

External links 
 The Slovak Chamber of Architects, official website

References 

Organisations based in Bratislava
Government-owned companies
Self-governance
1992 establishments in Slovakia
Organizations established in 1992
Architecture in Slovakia
Architecture-related professional associations